Noè Bordignon (September 3, 1841 – December 7, 1920) was an Italian painter, active mainly in Venice.

Biography 

He was born in Salvarosa near Castelfranco Veneto. He began studies in 1859 at the Accademia di Belle Arti of Venice, where he was a pupil of Michelangelo Grigoletti, Carlo De Blaas, and Pompeo Marino Molmenti. In 1865, he won a stipend to study in Rome. He later formed a strong friendship with Tranquillo Cremona. He favored painting genre scenes, in a style also favored by Giacomo Favretto, Luigi Nono and Alessandro Milesi. In 1869, he opened a studio in Venice.
 
He exhibited Le ragazze che cantano. In 1878 at Paris, he exhibited Costume romano; Il fuso della nonna ; Le pettegole: Un cortile a Venezia. In 1887 at Venice, he exhibited Fiori e dolci parole; Per l'America; Motti e Risate; Scarpette nuove; and Pater noster. He also painted frescoes and altarpieces.

He died in San Zenone degli Ezzelini.

References

External links 
 Short Biography

1841 births
1920 deaths
19th-century Italian painters
Italian male painters
20th-century Italian painters
Italian genre painters
Painters from Venice
Fresco painters
Accademia di Belle Arti di Venezia alumni
19th-century Italian male artists
20th-century Italian male artists